Johannes Munnikes (5 September 1916 – 1 June 2003) was a Dutch wrestler. He competed in the men's Greco-Roman lightweight at the 1948 Summer Olympics.

References

External links
 

1916 births
2003 deaths
Dutch male sport wrestlers
Olympic wrestlers of the Netherlands
Wrestlers at the 1948 Summer Olympics
Sportspeople from Amsterdam